Emergency medical services (EMS) Week, or EMS Week, was originally authorized by President Gerald Ford on November 4, 1974 for the week of November 3–10. Since 1992, EMS Week has moved to the third week of May. In 2023, the 48th annual celebration for EMS Week is scheduled for the week of May 21-27.

Locally, the leadership of EMS agencies, hospitals, and representatives from local or state legislature recognize EMS personnel during the week through events such as cook outs, giveaways, awards, and public recognition..

Past Themes 
 2006 - EMS: Serving on Health Care’s Front Line.
 2007 - Extraordinary People, Extraordinary Service.
 2008 - Your Life is Our Mission
 2009 - A Proud Partner In Your Community
 2010 - Anytime. Anywhere. We’ll be there.
 2011 - Everyday Heroes
 2012 - EMS, More Than A Job, A Calling
 2013 - EMS: One Mission. One Team.
 2014 - Dedicated. For Life.
 2015 - EMS Strong
 2016 - Called To Care
 2017 - EMS Strong — Always in Service
 2018 - Stronger Together
 2019 - EMS Strong – Beyond the Call
 2020 - Ready Today. Preparing for Tomorrow.
 2021 - This Is EMS: Caring for Our Communities
 2022 - EMS Strong - Rising to the Challenge

External links 
https://books.google.com.eg/books?id=Z3fBDLqFKowC&pg=PA833&dq=Emergency+Medical+Services+Week&hl=en&sa=X&ved=2ahUKEwjuoLOf2JXqAhWIzYUKHZS2BYQQ6AEwAHoECAUQAg

References

External links
EMS Week at EMSStrong.Org
EMS Week at American College of Emergency Physicians

1973 introductions
Emergency medical services in the United States
May observances
Awareness weeks in the United States
Observances in the United States by presidential proclamation
Health observances